St. Boswells Rugby Football Club are a rugby union side in the small village of St Boswells in the Borders, Scotland.

History

Founded in 1926; it closed in 1932–33; the club went into liquidation at the start of World War 2; and was revived after the War in 1946.

Its birth in 1926 was reported by the Southern Reporter newspaper of 26 August 1926:
Border devotees of the robust game of rugby are keenly interested in the new club which has been formed at St Boswells. and are hoping that will meet with success. Those who are behind it are out and out enthusiasts; and they have been getting a move on. The committee responsible for the season's arrangements have already fixed over a dozen matches, with the expectation few more. The Earl of Dalkeith has been elected president; subject to his consent; while the captain Mr J. M. Smith of Thornielaw and the vice-captain Mr Allan Mitchell. The Club are indebted Messrs A. and J. B. Turnbull of Kelso for the gift of goalposts, for which the members have expressed gratitude; and Mr. Fairbairn has granted the use a field, with an entrance off "Jenny Moore's Lane." On Monday the captain gave an interesting address on training, and we hope the players will take his words to heart, as there no "royal road" in this sport. To the St. Boswells ruggerites: Success!

They currently play in the Scottish National League Division Three.

St. Boswells had a run of 56 matches without defeat from 2012 to 2013 season; they won the BT Shield in 2015.

Sevens tournament

The club run the St. Boswells Sevens tournament.

Honours

Hawick Linden Sevens
 Champions (1): 2014
 BT Shield
 Champions (1): 2014-15
 Ellon Sevens
 Champions: 1983, 1991, 1992
 Panmure Sevens
 Champions: 1988
 Selkirk Junior Sevens
 Champions: 1988
 Gala Y.M. Sevens
 Champions: 1985
 Langholm Junior Sevens
 Champions: 1987
 Holy Cross Sevens
 Champions: 1985
 Walkerburn Sevens
 Champions: 2001
 North Berwick Sevens
 Champions: 1986, 1987, 1988

References

Scottish rugby union teams
Rugby union clubs in the Scottish Borders
Rugby clubs established in 1926
1926 establishments in Scotland